Comet Schaumasse is a periodic comet discovered by Alexandre Schaumasse (Nice, France) on 1 December 1911 as 12th magnitude.

Observations
By the end of 1912 it was recognised as a short period comet estimated to return in 7.1 years, later recalculated as 8 years. The 1919 return was recovered by Gaston Fayet (Paris, France) as magnitude 10.5.

The 1927 approach was magnitude 12, but the comet was missed on the 1935 approach. In 1937 it passed close to Jupiter which increased its orbital period slightly.

The comet was missed in 1968 and 1976. It was speculated that the increase in brightness in 1952 indicated a problem that led to it vanishing. In 1984, Elizabeth Roemer (Steward Observatory, Arizona, USA) found an image on photographs from 1976. The approach later that year, observed by James B. Gibson (Palomar Observatory, California, USA) and orbital calculations by Brian G. Marsden, confirmed the 1976 image was Comet Schaumasse. The comet has not been observed since 2001. The comet was not observed during the 2009 unfavorable apparition since the perihelion passage occurred when the comet was on the far side of the Sun.

It passed within 0.02 AU of the dwarf planet Ceres on 22 March 2010. It will pass within about 0.07 AU of Mars in mid July 2200.

The comet nucleus is estimated to be 2.6 kilometers in diameter.

References

External links
 Orbital simulation from JPL (Java) / Horizons Ephemeris
 24P/Schaumasse – Seiichi Yoshida @ aerith.net
 24P at Kronk's Cometography
 24P at Kazuo Kinoshita's Comets

Periodic comets
0024
024P
Comets in 2017
19111201